Julia Watts is an American fiction writer.

Career
Julia Watts is the author of novels, short stories, etc., especially in the genres of young adult fiction and lesbian fiction/erotica. 
Her novels include Finding H.F. for which she won the 2001 Lambda Literary Award in the children/young adult category. She was nominated again for the 2005 award in the erotica category as one of the authors of the story collection Once Upon a Dyke: New Exploits of Fairy Tale Lesbians. Women's Studies was a finalist for a Golden Crown Literary Society award. Her  young adult novel, Kindred Spirits, is for the emerging press Beanpole Books. Her 2018 novel, Quiver was awarded a Perfect Tens Award by VOYA and the Fall 2018 OKRA Pick by Southern Independent Booksellers Alliance. 
In addition to her fiction work, Watts recently co-edited an anthology of essays, memoirs and stories on the sensitive topic of menstruation titled Women. Period.

Watts holds a masters in fine arts, which she obtained from Spalding University. Watts resides in Knoxville, Tennessee, where she teaches at South College.

Bibliography

Novels

Wildwood Flowers (1996)
Phases Of The Moon (1997)
Piece of my Heart (1998)
Wedding Bell Blues (1999)
Mixed Blessings
Finding H.F. (2001) -- Winner Lambda Literary Award
Women's Studies (novel)|Women's Studies (2006)
The Kind of Girl I Am (Novel)   (2008)Secret City (2013) -- Nominated Lambda Literary AwardHypnotizing Chickens (2014)Quiver (2018)Needlework (2021)

Miranda Jasper Series (Young Adult)Kindred Spirits (2008)Free Spirits (2009)Revived Spirits (2011)

Other writingsOnce Upon a Dyke: New Exploits of Fairy Tale Lesbians (2004) Novella "Le Belle Rose"Bell, Book and Dyke: New Exploits of Magical Lesbians (2005) Novella "Skyclad"Stake through the Heart: New Exploits of Twilight Lesbians (2006) Novella "We Recruit"Tall in the Saddle: New Exploits of Western Lesbians (2007) Novella "The Sweetheart and the Spitfire"Women. Period.'' (editor with Parneshia Jones, Jo Ruby and Elizabeth Slade) (2008)

References

External links
Brief capsule biography

20th-century American novelists
21st-century American novelists
American women novelists
American women short story writers
Lambda Literary Award for Children's and Young Adult Literature winners
Living people
People from Knoxville, Tennessee
Year of birth missing (living people)
American lesbian writers
American LGBT novelists
Spalding University alumni
20th-century American women writers
21st-century American women writers
20th-century American short story writers
21st-century American short story writers